The Shire of Kaniva was a local government area in the Wimmera region of western Victoria, Australia, near the South Australian town of Bordertown.

History

Kaniva was originally part of the Shire of Wimmera when it was incorporated in 1862, then became part of the Shire of Lowan when it split away from Wimmera. The Shire of Lawloit was established in its own right out of the West Riding of Lowan on 29 May 1891. It was renamed Kaniva on 22 May 1939.

On 20 January 1995, the Shire of Kaniva was abolished, and along with the Shire of Kowree and parts of the Shires of Arapiles and Glenelg, was merged into the newly created Shire of West Wimmera.

Wards

The Shire of Kaniva was divided into three ridings, each of which elected three councillors:
 East Riding
 North Riding
 West Riding

Towns and localities
 Dinyarrak
 Kaniva*
 Lawloit
 Leeor
 Lillimur
 Miram
 Sandsmere
 Serviceton
 Telopea Downs
 Yanipy
 Yarrock
 Yearinga

* Council seat.

Population

* Estimates in 1958, 1983 and 1988 Victorian Year Books.

References

External links
 Victorian Places - Kaniva

Kaniva
1891 establishments in Australia